The Governor of the County of Kitui is the chief executive of the Kenya Devolved Government of Kitui County. The governor is the head of the executive branch of Kitui County government.

The current governor is Julius Malombe, of Wiper Democratic Movement- Kenya Party. Julius Malombe won the 9th August 2022 Kitui County Gubernatorial Election and was sworn in as the governor of Kitui County on 25 August 2022. Dr. Julius Malombe recaptured the governor's seat from Charity  Ngilu who had withdrawn her candidature a few weeks before the election. Available official hot line +254728825235

Line of succession
The Constitution of Kenya 2010 provides that in case of vacancy in the office of Kitui County Governor, the Deputy Governor is sworn in as Governor. The governor has 60 days to appoint a Deputy governor to fill the vacancy in the office of Deputy Governor.

References

Kitui County
Local government in Kenya